Massisteriidae is a family of granofilosean protists within the phylum Cercozoa.

Taxonomy
Massisteriidae contains two genera:
Massisteria 
Massisteria marina 
Massisteria voersi 
Minimassisteria 
Minimassisteria diva

References

External links

Cercozoa families